The 2013 Colorado Buffaloes football team represented the University of Colorado at Boulder during the 2013 NCAA Division I FBS football season. Led by first-year head coach Mike MacIntyre, the Buffaloes played their home games on-campus at Folsom Field in Boulder and were members of the Pac-12 Conference. Head coach Mike MacIntyre was hired after the firing of Jon Embree concluding the 2012 season.

Previous season
Colorado finished the 2012 season with a record of 1–11
, 1–8 in Pac-12 play, and last place in the South Division.

Recruiting
National Signing Day was on February 6, 2013 and Colorado signed high school athletes from around the country.

Schedule

 September 15's game against Fresno State was canceled due to effects from the Boulder Creek flash floods. On September 30, Charleston Southern was added as a replacement opponent to be played on October 19.

Game summaries

Colorado State

Central Arkansas

Oregon State

Oregon

Arizona State

Charleston Southern

Colorado's game vs Fresno State on September 14 was canceled due to flooding, making Colorado need to add a 12th game. On September 30, Charleston Southern was granted a waiver to play a 13th regular season game to be able to play Colorado.

Arizona

1st quarter scoring:

2nd quarter scoring:

3rd quarter scoring:

4th quarter scoring:

UCLA

1st quarter scoring: COLO – Will Oliver 23-yard field goal; UCLA – Devin Fuller 76-yard pass from Brett Hundley (Ka'imi Fairbairn kick)

2nd quarter scoring: COLO – Paul Richardson 7-yard pass from Sefo Liufau (Will Oliver kick); UCLA – Hundley 11-yard run (Fairbairn kick); UCLA – Devin Fuller 6-yard pass from Hundley (Fairbairn kick); COLO – Oliver 47-yard field goal

3rd quarter scoring: UCLA – Hundley 1-yard run (Fairbairn kick); UCLA – Damien Thigpen 5-yard run (Fairbairn kick)

4th quarter scoring: COLO – Tony Jones 2-yard run (Oliver kick); UCLA – Fairbairn 45-yard field goal; UCLA – Oliver 37-yard field goal; UCLA – Fuller 8-yard run (Fairbairn kick)

Washington

California

USC

Notes
 September 2, 2013 – Paul Richardson, WR, was named Pac-12 Conference offensive player of the week

References

Colorado
Colorado Buffaloes football seasons
Colorado Buffaloes football